Rigo Inland Rural LLG is a local-level government (LLG) of Central Province, Papua New Guinea.

Wards
01. Upper Maria
02. Central Maria
03. East Maria
04. West Maria
05. Ormand East
06. Ormand Central
07. Ormand West
08. Upper Mt. Brown
09. Central Mt. Brown
10. Lower Mt. Brown
11. Upper Boku/Doromu
12. Central Boku/Doromu
13. Lower Boku/Doromu
14. Upper Mt. Obree
15. Central Mt. Obree
16. Lower Mt. Obree

References

Local-level governments of Central Province (Papua New Guinea)